João Pedro Andrade Selgas Monteiro (born 29 August 1983) is a Portuguese table tennis player. At the 2015 European Championships, he won the gold medal in the Doubles competition. He also competed at the 2012 Summer Olympics in the Men's singles, but was defeated in the second round. This was a round further than he managed at the 2008 Summer Olympics.

João Monteiro practices at the Werner Schlager Academy in Schwechat, Austria since the opening in 2011.

Personal life
In July 2013, Monteiro married Romanian table tennis player Daniela Dodean.

References

External links

1983 births
Living people
People from Guarda, Portugal
Portuguese male table tennis players
Olympic table tennis players of Portugal
Table tennis players at the 2008 Summer Olympics
Table tennis players at the 2012 Summer Olympics
Table tennis players at the 2016 Summer Olympics
Table tennis players at the 2020 Summer Olympics
World Table Tennis Championships medalists
Table tennis players at the 2019 European Games
European Games medalists in table tennis
European Games bronze medalists for Portugal
Sportspeople from Guarda District
Mediterranean Games silver medalists for Portugal
Mediterranean Games medalists in table tennis
Competitors at the 2022 Mediterranean Games
21st-century Portuguese people